The 2015–16 season was the 108th season in Levante UD’s history and the 11th in the top-tier.

Current squad

Out on loan

Competitions

Overall

Overview

La Liga

League table

Results summary

Result round by round

Matches

See also
 2015–16 La Liga

References

External links
 Official website 

Levante UD seasons
Levante UD